The Stadion Narodowy (National Stadium)  is a retractable roof football stadium located in Warsaw, Poland.

Stadion Narodowy may also refer to the:
 Stadion Narodowy metro station

See also 
 Stadion Dziesięciolecia (the stadium that was located on the current Stadion Narodowy's site)
 National stadium (Stadion Narodowy in English)
 Warszawa Stadion railway station